Lesley Mackie (born 10 June 1951) is a British actress, known for her Olivier Award-winning performance as Judy Garland in the original London cast of Judy.  She is also known for her role as Daisy in the horror films The Wicker Man and The Wicker Tree.

Film credits

Theatre 
 Judy
 Brigadoon

References

External links
 
 Lesley Mackie at equity.org.uk

Living people
British film actresses
British musical theatre actresses
British television actresses
Laurence Olivier Award winners
1951 births